Happy Land is a 1943 film directed by Irving Pichel and starring Don Ameche. A World War II home front drama, it was based on the 1943 novel of the same name by MacKinlay Kantor.

Plot
Lew Marsh receives a message that his only son, Rusty, has been killed in the war. Lew, a pharmacist in the small town of Hartfield, Iowa, is so grief-stricken, he neglects everything and isolates himself.

One day, Lew is visited by his dead grandfather's spirit. "Gramp" is troubled by Lew's prolonged mourning and the way it is affecting his life and those around him. Lew tries to send him away, but Gramp has "all the time in the world". Gramp takes him on a stroll through the streets of town, showing him flashbacks of events from his and Rusty's life.

It begins with Lew and other Hartfield residents returning home after serving in World War I. He finds out that his girlfriend Velma married a Marine just the month before. He meets Agnes soon after, falls in love, and marries her. Gramp becomes sick, but lives long enough through sheer stubbornness to see Rusty born.

Rusty turns out to be a perky boy with a mind of his own, who cares a lot for his friends. He becomes a member of the Boy Scouts. As a teen helping out at his father's pharmacy, he gives an old man medicine for his sick wife, even though the man does not have enough to pay for it, later putting money he has been saving for something special in the cash register.

Rusty falls in love for the first time at eighteen, with a girl named Gretchen Barry. She soon dumps him for a young man, which was expected by both Lew and Agnes.  Lew tries to comfort him by giving him a glass of loganberry wine and toasting him as an adult. When Lenore Prentiss, a childhood friend, develops into a nice looking woman, Rusty takes notice.

Then the Nazis take control of Germany and invade Poland. Some of Rusty's friends join the Canadian armed forces, but Rusty continues helping out in the pharmacy. Then he leaves to study for his certificate. After some time, Rusty joins the Navy and is shipped out, bidding farewell to his parents and Lenore.

Back in the present, Gramp states that Rusty had a wonderful life up to his death. Lew is unconvinced, and Gramp tells him to go to pharmacy that evening. There he encounters a young sailor named Tony, someone Rusty often mentioned in his letters. Tony had agreed to tell Rusty's parents what happened if Rusty died.

Lew invites Tony home and introduces him to Agnes. Tony tells them about Rusty's last hours. After a torpedo struck their ship, Rusty was carrying a wounded man when a second one hit, flinging Tony into the water. That was the last he saw of his friend.

Cast

Production notes
An abridged version of MacKinlay Kantor's novel appeared in The Saturday Evening Post on November 28, 1942 and in the August 1943 issue of Reader's Digest.

Five-year-old Natalie Wood made her screen debut and appears in a bit part in the picture as a little girl who drops an ice cream cone.

Production lasted from June 13 to late July 1943.  According to The Hollywood Reporter, news items, and studio publicity, the picture was shot on location in Santa Rosa, California, with additional scenes being filmed in nearby Healdsburg. The Time magazine review said that some scenes were shot in Sebastopol. A The Hollywood Reporter news item stated that the picture would have its premiere in sixty-one theaters in Iowa on December 2, 1943.

Adaptations
Don Ameche starred in a Lux Radio Theatre broadcast of the story on April 10, 1944. A television adaptation of the film was presented on the 20th Century-Fox Hour (CBS Television) in February 1956, under the title "In Times Like These".

References

External links

1943 films
1940s fantasy drama films
20th Century Fox films
American black-and-white films
American fantasy drama films
Films about grieving
Films based on American novels
Films based on works by MacKinlay Kantor
Films directed by Irving Pichel
Films scored by Cyril J. Mockridge
Films set in Iowa
Films set in the 1910s
Films set in the 1920s
Films set in the 1930s
Films set in the 1940s
Films set on the home front during World War II
American ghost films
World War II films made in wartime
Films with screenplays by Kathryn Scola
1943 drama films
1940s English-language films